Syllectus is a genus of beetles in the family Carabidae, endemic to New Zealand.

Species
 Syllectus anomalus Bates, 1878
 Syllectus gouleti Larochelle & Lariviere, 2005
 Syllectus magnus Britton, 1964

References

Harpalinae